Charles Sumner Axtell (January 29, 1859 – November 24, 1932) was an American sport shooter who competed at the 1908 Summer Olympics. At the 1908 Olympics he won a gold medal in the team pistol event and finished in fourth place in the individual pistol event.

References

External links
profile

1859 births
1932 deaths
American male sport shooters
ISSF pistol shooters
Shooters at the 1908 Summer Olympics
Olympic gold medalists for the United States in shooting
Olympic medalists in shooting
People from Hyannis, Massachusetts
Sportspeople from Barnstable County, Massachusetts
Medalists at the 1908 Summer Olympics
20th-century American people